Kelly T. Keisling (born March 16, 1951 in Albany, Kentucky) is an American politician and a Republican member of the Tennessee House of Representatives representing District 38 since January 2011.

Education
Keisling attended Belmont University.

Career
During the COVID-19 pandemic, Keisling opposed vaccine requirements.

Elections
2012 Keisling was unopposed for the August 2, 2012 Republican Primary, winning with 4,575 votes, and won the November 6, 2012 General election with 14,190 votes (71.8%) against Democratic nominee David Harper.
2010 To challenge District 38 incumbent Democratic Representative Leslie Winningham, Keisling was unopposed for the August 5, 2010 Republican Primary, winning with 5,537 votes, and won the November 2, 2010 General election with 7,965 votes (56.5%) against Representative Winningham.

References

External links
Official page at the Tennessee General Assembly

Kelly Keisling at Ballotpedia
Kelly T. Keisling at OpenSecrets
Official Campaign Website via State Representative Kelly Keisling 

1951 births
Living people
Belmont University alumni
Republican Party members of the Tennessee House of Representatives
People from Albany, Kentucky
People from Pickett County, Tennessee
21st-century American politicians